is a UK company law case dealing with unfair prejudice under section 459 Companies Act 1985 (now section 994 Companies Act 2006). It was decided at first instance by Peter Smith J.

Facts
Rock Nominees Ltd was part of the business empire of Lord Ashcroft, a Conservative life peer. It is a company which holds shares on behalf of other companies. It had 201,300 shares for Gambier Holdings Inc. (a British Virgin Islands company) and 65,000 shares for Kiwi Ltd. (a Belize company) invested in RCO (Holdings) plc. Its stake made up 2.48%. RCO itself was in the cleaning, catering and security porterage business. In 2000, ISS (UK) Ltd took over RCO, acquiring 96.4% of the shares. It made one of RCO's subsidiaries transfer its shares to one of ISS's subsidiaries for £30,117,784. Rock Nominee's filed for a petition of unfair prejudice on the grounds that this was a transaction at an undervalue. It did not reflect the value to the purchaser of the synergies arising from the sale or the value of avoiding risk from a sale on the open market.

Judgment

High Court
Peter Smith J, in a lengthy judgment held that the petition would be refused. Although some of the conduct by RCO constituted a breach of fiduciary duty, Rock Nominees had not discharged the burden of proof to show that the shares were transferred at an undervalue. The evidence suggested, including a report from a financial expert that Rock Nominees called, that the price did reflect a premium for "synergies". Moreover, Peter Smith J was inclined to draw adverse inferences from some of the murkier omissions in the evidence that Lord Ashcroft had given.

Court of Appeal
Potter LJ, Jonathan Parker LJ and Sir Swinton Thomas dismissed the appeal. They held that although the directors had breached their fiduciary duties, Rock Nominees had not suffered prejudice because the best price had been achieved. ROC could not have compelled ISS (UK) Ltd to pay more because only ISS (UK) Ltd was attracted by the potential cost saving. Furthermore, as majority shareholder ISS (UK) Ltd was able to place RCO in members' voluntary liquidation and at any time force a sale of assets on the open market.

See also
For the full case see http://www.bailii.org/ew/cases/EWCA/Civ/2004/118.html
UK company law
Unfair prejudice
Greenmail
RCO Support Services v Unison [2002] EWCA Civ 464

United Kingdom company case law
2004 in case law
2004 in British law
Court of Appeal (England and Wales) cases